Curtis Robertson Jr. (born 1953) is an American bassist, guitarist and songwriter. He was once married to former Motown singer Syreeta, former wife of Stevie Wonder. Curtis was influential in the development of Syreeta's music and recorded and co-wrote music with Syreeta.

Curtis also toured with the Les McCann/Eddie Harris Band, Robben Ford, Maxine Weldon, Steve Hillage, Randy Crawford, Gary Bartz, Gladys Knight and recorded with Bobby "Blue" Bland, Gary Bartz, Freddie Hubbard, David T. Walker, and Richard Thompson.

Between 1990 and 2005, Curtis was the bassist for Lou Rawls. Like with Syreeta, he helped shape the music for which Rawls would become known.

Curtis lives in the Los Angeles area where he freelances as a musician. He is currently a member of vocalist Nailah Porter's band and also the hard bop CJS Quintet.

Discography

With Gary Bartz
Love Song (Vee-Jay International, 1977)
With Willie Bobo
Tomorrow Is Here (Blue Note, 1977)
With Freddie Hubbard
Bundle of Joy (Columbia, 1977)
With Syreeta Wright
One to One (Tamla, 1977)

References

1953 births
African-American musicians
Living people
21st-century African-American people
20th-century African-American people